Victor Webster (born February 7, 1973) is a Canadian actor. He is known for being the second actor to play Nicholas Alamain on the NBC daytime soap Days of Our Lives from 1999 to 2000, and for his roles as the mutant Brennan Mulwray in Mutant X, Coop the cupid on Charmed and detective Carlos Fonnegra in Continuum.

He is also known for his portrayal of Mathayus of Akkad / The Scorpion King in The Scorpion King 3: Battle for Redemption (2012) and The Scorpion King 4: Quest for Power (2015).

Early life
Victor Webster was born in Calgary, Alberta, the son of Roswitha, a hair stylist, and John ("Jack") Webster, a police officer. As a teenager, his behaviour often got him into trouble. To find a more productive outlet, he started studying martial arts and eventually became a teacher of this, earning an undefeated record as an amateur kickboxer and heavyweight black belt. Meanwhile, his early interest in acting was demonstrated in his involvement with numerous school plays and theatre classes.

Career
Webster worked as a stockbroker and in import/export. He appeared in Cosmopolitan magazine's "All About Men" 1998 special issue. He began to pursue acting opportunities in the late 1990s. In 1999 he landed a part on the NBC daytime soap opera, Days of Our Lives. After leaving Days, he was cast as one of the leads in the nationally syndicated SF-action series Mutant X (2001), which ran for three seasons. In 2002, he was listed as one of People magazine's "50 Most Eligible Bachelors".

Webster appeared in the film Bringing Down the House and made guest appearances on other TV shows, including a 2003 role on HBO's Sex and the City, while working on Mutant X. Since Mutant X, Webster has continued to alternate between television and theatrical film roles. In 2006 he appeared in the final episodes of Charmed, portraying Coop, a cupid who married Phoebe Halliwell (played by Alyssa Milano) in the final episode of the series.

In 2009, Webster had a recurring role as Caleb Brewer on the Melrose Place relaunch. He appeared on the season 5 episode "Parasite" of Criminal Minds playing a con artist-turned-serial killer. He also guest-starred in the 2009 murder mystery Harper's Island. He had a small role in the 2010 Tyler Perry film Why Did I Get Married Too. In 2011, he had a recurring role on Castle as Kate Beckett's boyfriend, Josh Davidson. In the 2013 remake of Embrace of the Vampire, he played the lead male vampire Stefan. On Girlfriends' Guide to Divorce, he played Carl, a gigolo. In the 2016 Hallmark original movie Summer Villa, he's a chef.  In 2019, Webster began starring in the Hallmark Movies & Mysteries series The Matchmaker Mysteries.

Personal life 
Webster got engaged to actress Shantel VanSanten on February 9, 2021. They married in October 2021.

Filmography

References

External links

 
 

1973 births
Male actors from Calgary
Canadian male film actors
Canadian male models
Canadian expatriates in the United States
Canadian male soap opera actors
Canadian male television actors
Living people
Saddleback College alumni
Stockbrokers
20th-century Canadian male actors
21st-century Canadian male actors